Hutchinson Community College (HutchCC or HCC) is a public community college in Hutchinson, Kansas. It serves nearly 5,000 credit students every semester.

History
The college was established in the spring of 1928 as Hutchinson Junior College, and held its first classes that fall. On July 1, 1965, the name was changed to Hutchinson Community Junior College, then in 1980 to Hutchinson Community College. 

On July 1, 1993, Hutchinson Community College was renamed once again to Hutchinson Community College and Area Vocational School after a merger with the local vocational school. In 2012, the vocational school addition was removed, and the institution finally became known as Hutchinson Community College.

Campuses

The main campus is located at 1300 North Plum in Hutchinson, Kansas, and mostly bounded between the streets of 11th Street, 14th Street, and Plum Street. HCC has two satellite locations, in McPherson, Kansas and Newton, Kansas.

Academics
Students can choose from more than 70 different academic programs, leading to Associate in Arts and Associate in Science degrees. Hutchinson Community College has transfer and articulation agreements with every Kansas Regents university and college, as well as a variety of other institutions across the country.

The college also offers over 50 technical programs.

Athletics

The Hutchinson Blue Dragons are the sports teams of Hutchinson Community College. They participate in the National Junior College Athletic Association (NJCAA) and in the Kansas Jayhawk Community College Conference.

Notable alumni

Kadeem Allen (born 1993), professional basketball player
De'Vondre Campbell, professional football player
Andy Dirks (born 1986), professional baseball player
Gerald Everett, professional football player
Steve Fritz (born 1967), 1996 Olympic decathlete
Markus Golden, professional football player
Shaun Hill, former professional football player
Darius Johnson-Odom, professional basketball player
Alvin Kamara (born 1995), professional football player
Jeremiah Ledbetter, professional football player
Andre Morris (born 1972), sprint runner
Cordarrelle Patterson, professional football player
Mike Zagurski, professional baseball pitcher

See also
Hutchinson Sports Arena
Cosmosphere space museum

References

External links

Community colleges in Kansas
Education in Reno County, Kansas
1928 establishments in Kansas
Two-year colleges in the United States
NJCAA athletics
Educational institutions established in 1928